Nyayo House is a skyscraper in Nairobi, Kenya. It hosts several government departments such as immigration (the State Department for Immigration, Border Control, and Regulation of Persons) and also serves as the headquarters of Nairobi Province. The building is located at the corner of Uhuru Highway and Kenyatta Avenue. It is 84 metres high and has 27 floors

Planning of the tower started in 1973 and it was initially set to be named as Nairobi House. Construction started in 1979, one year after Daniel arap Moi took over as the president of Kenya. Building of the house was completed in 1983. The building was planned by Ministry of Public Works, Ngotho Architects and constructed by Laxmanbhai Construction. 

Nyayo House is particularly known for its detention facilities in its basement, often called as "Nyayo House torture chambers". Many opponents of the Moi government were beaten there by Special Branch officials (the Special Branch was later renamed the National Security Intelligence Service). Some of the known detainees at Nyayo House were George Anyona, Wahome Mutahi and Raila Odinga

After the Moi era the Truth, Justice and Reconciliation Commission (TJRC) investigated Nyayo House torture cases, and several victims— including politician Koigi wa Wamwere —have been compensated. Another detainee, musician Ochieng Kabaselleh died soon after he was released, allegedly due to injuries caused by torture. The former torture chambers have now been opened to the general public. 

Nyayo House is also infamous for its association with state corruption.

Gallery

References 

Government buildings completed in 1983
Buildings and structures in Nairobi
Skyscraper office buildings in Kenya
1980s in Nairobi